Dhoom Dhoom is an EP by Tata Young, released in 2005 after the success of the Bollywood film Dhoom. Young sang the leading song, "Dhoom Dhoom", which shot to number one in the music charts of many Asian countries.

The EP features the following songs on the Japanese release, where Tata Young has experienced a great deal of success. This EP, as well as Tata Young's older English album I Believe and her newer album Temperature Rising can still be found in some Japanese CD stores.

Track listing

Tata Young albums